Harry M. Olivieri (May 25, 1916 – July 22, 2006) was an American restaurateur of Italian descent. He is credited, along with his brother, Pat Olivieri, as the co-creator of the cheesesteak in 1933. The brothers opened Pat's King of Steaks in 1940, one of the best known purveyors of steak sandwiches in Philadelphia.

Early life
Olivieri was born in South Philadelphia to Italian parents Michael and Maria Olivieri. The family returned to Italy when he was three, returning to Philadelphia four years later. He attended Southwark School before leaving to work as a carpenter.  Olivieri married his wife, Anna DeLuca, in 1936.

Pat's King of Steaks
In 1930, he opened a hot dog stall with his older brother Pat Olivieri at the corners of 9th Street, Wharton and Passyunk Avenues.  The brothers ran the stall while holding down other jobs; Harry worked as a carpenter, while Pat made sleds.

In 1933, as the family relates the story, the brothers invented the steak sandwich, selling the first one to a cab driver for ten cents.

In 1940, the brothers rented space to open Pat's King of Steaks at the same spot that they had their stand. The two brothers worked at the restaurant for 15 to 18 hours a day for the next few decades while the restaurant was open 24 hours a day. Harry worked at the Philadelphia Naval Yard during World War II before returning to the restaurant.

In 1972, Olivieri had a heart attack and retired from day-to-day management. He still visited the business for a few hours each day to meet and greet the customers. Pat's son Herbert Olivieri disputed ownership of the business with Harry and his children. Son Frank Olivieri eventually bought out his father, sister and cousin.

In the last few years of his life, he lived with his daughter in Brigantine, New Jersey. He died of heart failure on July 22, 2006, in Pomona, New Jersey, at the age of 90.

His grandson, Frank Jr., now runs the business.

See also
 History of Italian Americans in Philadelphia

Notes

External links
 Philadelphia Daily News "Steak legend Harry Olivieri dies" 21 July 2006 accessed 25 July 2006
 New York Times, "Harry Olivieri, 90, Co-Inventor of Cheese Steak in Philadelphia, Dies" July 22, 2006 retrieved July 25, 2006
Interview with Frank Olivieri

American chefs
American male chefs
American people of Italian descent
Businesspeople from Philadelphia
People from Brigantine, New Jersey
1916 births
2006 deaths
20th-century American businesspeople